Jérôme Louis Heldring (21 December 1917 – 27 April 2013) was a Dutch journalist. He was columnist (1953–2012) and editor-in-chief (1968–1972) of the newspapers Nieuwe Rotterdamsche Courant and NRC Handelsblad.

Biography 
Jérôme Louis Heldring was born on 21 December 1917 in Amsterdam, Netherlands.

Heldring started to write columns in Nieuwe Rotterdamsche Courant (NRC) in 1953. From 1960 onwards, his column was called Dezer dagen (Our Days). In 1968, he became the editor-in-chief of the NRC, which merged with Algemeen Handelsblad in 1970 to form NRC Handelsblad. He stayed on as editor-in-chief until 1972.

He was one of the most influential political commentators in the Netherlands. His intellectual position was conservative and he was concerned with the history of civilization; his intellectual outlook was skeptical, detached, and precise.

He stopped writing his column for NRC Handelsblad on 5 April 2012, stating he did not have any more inspiration to write. He died a year later, on 27 April 2013 in The Hague.

Bibliography 
 1964: Democratie in debat (Debating democracy)
 1968: Spanning en ontspanning na Tsjechoslowakije (Entente and détente after Czechoslovakia)
 1975: Het verschil met anderen (The difference with others)
 1978: Ontspanning door Oostelijke en Westelijke bril (Détente, seen through Eastern and Western glasses)
 1985: Geschiedenis na 1945 (History after 1945)
 1986: Andermans veren. Uit de citatenverzameling van J.L. Heldring (Another person's feathers)
 1989: Een dilettant (A dilettante)
 1993: De taal op zichzelf is niets (Language by itself is nothing)
 2003: Heel ons fundament kraakt, en andere kanttekeningen (Our whole foundation is cracking, and other annotations)
 2013: Dezer dagen (These Days)

References

Further reading 
De conservatieve uitdaging : de scepsis van J.L. Heldring, Prometheus, 2003 (The conservative challenge. The skepticism of J.L. Heldring)
Dezer jaren : buitenlands beleid & internationale werkelijkheid : beschouwingen aangeboden aan J.L. Heldring bij diens afscheid als directeur van het Nederlands Genootschap voor Internationale Zaken, In den Toren, 1982 (One of those years. Foreign Policy and International Reality. Reflections presented to J.L. Heldring at the occasion of resigning his position as Director of the Netherlands Society for International Affairs - NIGZ)

External links 
  Profile of J.L. Heldring at the Digital Library for Dutch Literature
  Columns by J.L. Heldring at NRC Handelsblad
  Mark Kranenburg, "Voormalig NRC-hoofdredacteur Heldring (1917-2013) overleden", NRC Handelsblad, 2013.

1917 births
2013 deaths
Dutch columnists
Dutch journalists
Dutch newspaper editors
Writers from Amsterdam
Leiden University alumni